Zhou Yang (born 9 June 1991) is a female Chinese short track speed skater. She won the gold medal in the 1500 m event at the 2010 Winter Olympics. She also won the Gold Medal in 1500m event at 2014 Sochi Olympics.
Zhou added another gold medal on the Chinese 3000 m relay team. She set a new world and Olympic record in the 1,000 m semifinal. She was bestowed the honour of the national flag bearer for China at the 2018 Winter Olympics in PyeongChang, South Korea  as China's most decorated active winter Olympian with 3 gold medals from previous Olympics, after Yang Yang and Wang Meng who have retired from the sport.

Early life
Zhou Yang started skating at age eight. A speed skating coach noticed that she had potential in the sport.

In the 2008 World Short Track Speed Skating Championships, Zhou Yang won the gold medal in the women's 3000 meter super final. Zhou was also ranked second overall, following another Chinese skater Wang Meng.

References

External links 
 
 
 
 

1991 births
Living people
Chinese female speed skaters
Chinese female short track speed skaters
Olympic gold medalists for China
Olympic short track speed skaters of China
Speed skaters from Changchun
Short track speed skaters at the 2010 Winter Olympics
Short track speed skaters at the 2014 Winter Olympics
Short track speed skaters at the 2018 Winter Olympics
Olympic medalists in short track speed skating
Medalists at the 2010 Winter Olympics
Medalists at the 2014 Winter Olympics
Asian Games medalists in short track speed skating
Short track speed skaters at the 2007 Asian Winter Games
Short track speed skaters at the 2011 Asian Winter Games
Asian Games gold medalists for China
Medalists at the 2007 Asian Winter Games
Medalists at the 2011 Asian Winter Games
Universiade medalists in short track speed skating
World Short Track Speed Skating Championships medalists
Universiade silver medalists for China
Competitors at the 2009 Winter Universiade
20th-century Chinese women
21st-century Chinese women